Edmond is a city in Oklahoma County, Oklahoma, United States, and a part of the Oklahoma City metropolitan area in the central part of the state. The population was 94,428 according to the 2020 United States Census, making it the fifth largest city in Oklahoma.

The city borders the northern boundary of Oklahoma City. Public transportation is provided by Citylink Edmond bus service.

History

19th century
The Santa Fe rail line in Oklahoma Territory established a water and coaling station for steam engines at this location when the Santa Fe Railroad built into Indian Territory in 1887. The site for the station was chosen because it was the highest point on the line in Oklahoma County; train could more easily accelerate going downhill while leaving the station in either direction. The railroad then named the station for Edmond Burdick, the Santa Fe's traveling freight agent. When the town was formed after the Oklahoma Land Run of 1889, early settlers decided to adopt the name. Though most of the remnants of the old railroad infrastructure are gone, the Santa Fe, now BNSF, freight line still runs through the same course. 

The town of Edmond sprang up overnight during the great Oklahoma land run on April 22, 1889, when homesteads were staked around the Santa Fe station. The original plat for Edmond was prepared by the Seminole Town and Development Company, a newly formed syndicate with ties to the railroad. Many of the original streets were named for men associated with either the Santa Fe Railroad or the town syndicate. The first mayor and city officers were elected in May 1889, and Edmond's population was 294 in the 1890 census.

The first public schoolhouse in Oklahoma Territory, completed in August 1889, is in Edmond. It still stands as a historic monument on 2nd Street between Boulevard and Broadway and is open to the public on the first two Saturdays of each month or by appointment.

St. John the Baptist Catholic Church, the first church opened after the land run, was located on the southwest corner of East First and South Boulevard. The congregation still exists, although not in its original building or location.

In December 1890, the territorial legislature established three universities: the state university in Norman, the agricultural and mechanical college in Stillwater, and a "normal" or teaching school in Edmond.
The first classes for the Territorial Normal School (University of Central Oklahoma) were held November 9, 1891, in the Methodist Church on the southwest corner of North Broadway and West Hurd. Old North, the Territorial Normal School's iconic first building, was opened for classes on January 2, 1893, and ahead of Oklahoma State University's Central Hall or Oklahoma University's Science Hall.

The Edmond Sun, established by Milton W. "Kicking Bird" Reynolds on July 18, 1889, was the state's oldest continuous newspaper dating from Oklahoma Territorial days.

20th century
In the early 20th century, Edmond was known as a sundown town. Racial covenants barred property sales to individuals of races other than white people or Native Americans in every neighborhood built between 1911 and 1949 except the Edmond Highway Addition in 1924. Racial housing covenants in the United States became unenforceable in 1948 after the Shelly v. Kraemer decision by the United States Supreme Court.

Edmond was the site of a workplace shooting on August 20, 1986, in which 14 people were killed and six wounded by Patrick Sherrill, an ex-postman who then committed suicide. This event was the deadliest killing in a string of U.S. postal employee murder–suicides which inspired the slang term "going postal". A memorial to the victims of the attack stands outside the U.S. Post Office in downtown Edmond.

The city was the subject of a Tenth Circuit Court of Appeals case challenging the depiction of a Christian cross on the city seal, raising issues concerning the Establishment Clause of the U.S. Constitution. In May 1996, the Supreme Court let stand a Federal Appeals Court ruling ordering the city to remove the cross from the seal. Rather than replace the cross, the city council voted to leave the spot blank so as to "remind people of what was there," as well as this being the least expensive way to comply.

21st century
A memorial service for famed Oklahoman baseball player Bobby Murcer was held in Edmond on August 6, 2008, at the Memorial Road Church of Christ. Among the some 2,000 attending the memorial were Reggie Jackson, Derek Jeter, Andy Pettitte, and former Yankees manager Joe Girardi.

Geography
Edmond is located just north of Oklahoma City in Oklahoma County, Oklahoma. Arcadia Lake on the east side of the city is a fishing spot for the Oklahoma City metropolitan area and contains bluegill, channel catfish, blue catfish, and largemouth bass. Twin Bridges Lake is a second lake in the city.

Edmond lies in the Sandstone Hills region of Central Oklahoma, known for hills, blackjack oak, and post oak. The city falls into an ecological region known as the Cross Timbers.

Climate
Edmond has a humid subtropical climate with frequent variations in weather during part of the year and consistently hot summers. Prolonged and severe droughts often lead to wildfires and heavy rainfall often leads to flash flooding and flooding. Consistent winds, usually from the south or south-southeast during the summer, help temper the hotter weather. Consistent northerly winds during the winter can intensify cold periods. Severe ice storms and snowstorms happen sporadically during the winter.

The city is located in Tornado Alley and is subject to frequent and severe tornadoes and hailstorms. The Oklahoma City metropolitan area is one of the most tornado-prone major cities in the world.

Demographics

According to estimates from ESRI: There are approximately 94,000 residents and approximately 37,000 housing units. Population estimates by race/ethnicity are 79.8% white, 5.8% black, 2.7% American Indian, 4.1% Asian, 0.1% Pacific Islander, 2.5% other race and 5% two or more races. 7.2% of the population is of Hispanic origin. 
The population is 51.5% female and 48.5% male. The median age of residents is 36.3 years, lower than the Oklahoma median age of 37.8. 
The average household income is $101,811.

Economy
The supermarket chain Crest Foods is based in Edmond. The University of Central Oklahoma is a major employer. Some of Edmond's targeted industries include Wholesale Trade; Light Manufacturing; Information; and Professional, Scientific and Technical Services.

Top employers
According to the city's 2017 Comprehensive Annual Financial Report, the top employers in the city are:

Arts and culture
The city of Edmond is making efforts to promote public art with murals, stained glass, and steel sculptures. On a portion of Main Street, statuary lines nearly every corner. On July 4, 2007, the city inaugurated a bronze statue of Nannita R.H. Daisey, believed to be the first woman laying claim on Oklahoma land in the first (1889) land run. In 2015 the Dave McGary sculpture of Chief Touch the Clouds was relocated to Edmond from Houston's Astrodome. The 18-foot-tall, 15-foot-wide sculpture is located on Second Street at the entrance of the University of Central Oklahoma.

Edmond residents have access to 57 Protestant and three Catholic congregations, six Latter-day Saint congregations, one Unitarian Universalist church, one Islamic mosque, and one Haziratu'l-Quds for followers of the Baháʼí Faith.

A 163 foot tall cross sits at the Edmond Campus of Life.Church on the corner of Edmond Road and the I-35 Service Road. The church's pastor, Craig Groeschel, fought the city of Edmond to erect the cross, which the planning commission didn't want to allow because they considered it a billboard.

Sports
Rugby union is a developing sport in Edmond as well as in the Oklahoma City metropolitan area. Edmond boasts two rugby clubs: The Edmond Rugby Club (aka "The Storm") and the University of Central Oklahoma Rugby Football Club.

Education

Elementary schools
Source: 
 Angie Debo Elementary School (outside of Edmond)
 Centennial Elementary School
 Charles Haskell Elementary School (outside of Edmond)
 Chisholm Elementary School
 Clegern Elementary School
 Clyde Howell (This is the district's early-childhood education center)
 Cross Timbers Elementary School
 Frontier Elementary School
 Heritage Elementary School
 Ida Freeman Elementary School
 John Ross Elementary School
 Northern Hills Elementary School
 Orvis Risner Elementary School
 Russell Dougherty Elementary School
 Sunset Elementary School
 Washington Irving Elementary School
 West Field Elementary School
 Will Rogers Elementary School
 Redbud Elementary (scheduled to open Fall 2021) 
 Scissortail Elementary (scheduled to open TBD)

Middle schools
 Central Middle School
 Cheyenne Middle School
 Cimarron Middle School
 Heartland Middle School
 Oakdale Middle School
 Sequoyah Middle School
 Summit Middle School (outside of Edmond)

High schools
 Edmond Memorial High School
 Edmond North High School
 Edmond Santa Fe High School
 Boulevard Academy

Colleges and universities
 Herbert W. Armstrong College
 University of Central Oklahoma

Private schools
 Holy Trinity Lutheran School
 Mercy School Institute
 Oklahoma Christian School
 Oklahoma Christian Academy
 The Academy of Classical Christian Studies
 St. Elizabeth Ann Seton Catholic School
 St. Mary's Episcopal School

Notable people
Dusty Allen, Major League Baseball player (San Diego Padres and Detroit Tigers) graduated from Edmond Memorial High School
Jim Beaver, actor (star of Deadwood and Supernatural) lived in Edmond 1971–1976.
Paul Blair, NFL offensive tackle, drafted by the Chicago Bears in 1986, graduated from Edmond Memorial High School
Allison Brown, Miss Oklahoma Teen USA 1986, Miss Teen USA 1986
Former Federal Emergency Management Agency (FEMA) Director Michael Brown interned in the city's Emergency Management Department while receiving a B.A. in public administration/political science from Central State University (now the University of Central Oklahoma), in Edmond. Brown was employed by the City of Edmond as the Assistant to the City Manager.
New York Times best-selling author and Internet entrepreneur Joel Comm lived in Edmond from 1998 to 2007.
Greyson Chance, Internet celebrity and recording artist who lives in Edmond
Professional soccer player Daryl Dike, graduated from Edmond North High School
Kristian Doolittle (born 1997), basketball player for Hapoel Eilat of the Israeli Basketball Premier League
Robert Galbreath, Jr. (1863-1953), lived a short time in Edmond, where he served as deputy U.S. marshal and as Edmond's postmaster.<ref name="EOHC-Galbreath">[http://www.okhistory.org/publications/enc/entry.php?entry=GA002 Larry O'Dell, "Galbreath Robert' (1863 - 1953)." Encyclopedia of Oklahoma History and Culture.] Retrieved May 12, 2014.</ref>
Jim Gentile, Major League Baseball player 
KC Green, comic artist, graduated from the University of Central Oklahoma
Retired Kansas City Chiefs and Super Bowl winning Baltimore Ravens' nose guard Kelly Gregg, all-state football player and wrestler for Edmond Memorial and Edmond North.
Blake Griffin, forward for the Brooklyn Nets, graduated from Edmond's Oklahoma Christian School
Johny Hendricks, UFC welterweight champion, graduated from Edmond Memorial High School 2002
Mat Hoffman, BMX rider, graduated from Edmond Memorial High School 1990
DaQuan Jeffries, NBA G League player for the College Park Skyhawks
Hoda Katebi, Iranian-American writer and activist, graduated from Edmond Santa Fe High School in 2012
Trey Kennedy, Internet comedian and musician
Darci Lynne, ventriloquist and winner of season 12 of America's Got TalentBrady Manek, college basketball player
Shannon Miller, (b. 1977), Olympic gold medal in gymnastics (1996); has earned more Olympic medals (seven) and World Championship medals (nine) than any other American gymnast; attended Edmond North High School.
Garrett Richards, Major League Baseball player for the Los Angeles Angels, grew up and graduated from Edmond Memorial High School in 2006
Josh Richardson, Dallas Mavericks basketball player
Bob Ricks, former Edmond Chief of Police and former FBI agent involved in the controversial 1993 Waco Siege
Mookie Salaam, professional sprinter for Team USA, won the 200m NCAA Indoor National Championship with a time of 20.41. In 2013, he won a silver medal for Team USA as part of the 4 × 100 m relay team at the World Championships in Moscow, Russia.
Bill Self, head men's basketball coach at the University of Kansas, was Oklahoma Player of the Year in basketball in 1981 while playing at Edmond Memorial High School, inducted into the Naismith Memorial Basketball Hall of Fame in 2017.
Mark Snyder, Oklahoma state senator and businessman
Laura Spencer, actress, notably in The Lizzie Bennet Diaries, Bones, and The Big Bang Theory''
Ekpe Udoh, basketball forward and center with the Milwaukee Bucks of the National Basketball Association
William C. Wantland, Bishop of the Episcopal Diocese of Eau Claire
Brandon Weeden, graduated from Edmond Santa Fe; drafted by the New York Yankees; returned to Oklahoma State University, where he started at quarterback; drafted by the Cleveland Browns.
Former Oklahoma City Thunder point guard Russell Westbrook, owns two homes in Edmond
Brandon Whitaker, CFL running back, playing for the Montreal Alouettes
Steve Zabel, NFL linebacker and tight end, drafted by the Philadelphia Eagles in 1970, resides in Edmond
Music industry figures Mike Kennerty and Chris Gaylor of the pop rock group The All-American Rejects, and Mikaila.
Christian band Mercy Me was founded in Edmond and called Edmond home in the mid 1990s. They lived and practiced in an abandoned day care center just south of the local university. The band led worship for the Henderson Hills Baptist Church youth group in between touring dates. 
Several golf PGA Tour players call Edmond home, as does the well-known Oak Tree National. Edmond's golfers include Bob Tway, Doug Tewell, Scott Verplank, David Edwards and Gil Morgan.

References

External links

City of Edmond Official Website
Encyclopedia of Oklahoma History and Culture - Edmond Post Office Massacre
Encyclopedia of Oklahoma History and Culture - Edmond

 
Oklahoma City metropolitan area
Cities in Oklahoma
Cities in Oklahoma County, Oklahoma
Populated places established in 1889
1889 establishments in Indian Territory
Sundown towns in Oklahoma